Tailwind Airlines is a Turkish charter airline based in Istanbul which operates flights from its bases at Antalya Airport.

History
The airline was founded as a joint Turkish-British project, with the first commercial flight taking place in May 2009. Founded by Kadri Muhiddin, Safi Ergin and Mehmet Demir Uz in 2006, the low-cost airline operated five Boeing 737-400 as of August 2013. In early September 2016, a Boeing 737-800 with aircraft registration TC-TLH was banned from Lebanon for landing at Ben Gurion Airport in Israel. After a technical check, Tailwind Airlines briefly operated the aircraft, which had previously been leased to Wings of Lebanon and painted in its colors, on its own routes.

Destinations
As of August 2013, Tailwind Airlines flies to various destinations in Europe and Asia:
Belgium
Brussels – Brussels Airport
Bosnia and Herzegovina
Sarajevo – Sarajevo International Airport
Croatia
Zagreb – Zagreb Airport
Czech Republic
Prague – Ruzyne Airport
Brno - Brno–Tuřany Airport 
Germany
Berlin – Schönefeld Airport
Bremen – Bremen Airport
Cologne – Cologne/Bonn Airport
Dortmund – Dortmund Airport
Düsseldorf – Düsseldorf Airport
Dresden – Dresden Airport
Erfurt/Weimar – Erfurt-Weimar Airport
Hahn – Frankfurt-Hahn Airport
Hamburg – Hamburg Airport
Hannover – Hannover Airport
Kassel – Kassel Airport
Leipzig – Leipzig/Halle Airport
Munich – Munich Airport
Nuremberg – Nuremberg Airport
Stuttgart – Stuttgart Airport
Hungary
Budapest – Ferihegy Airport
Debrecen – Debrecen Airport
Iraq
Erbil - Erbil International Airport
Israel
Tel Aviv - Ben Gurion Airport
Italy
Bologna – Guglielmo Marconi Airport
Milan – Malpensa Airport
Rome – Fiumicino Airport
Verona – Villafranca Airport
Jordan
Amman – Queen Alia International Airport
North Cyprus
North Nicosia – Ercan Airport
Norway
Oslo – Gardermoen Airport
Stavanger – Sola Airport
Ålesund – Ålesund Airport, Vigra
Slovakia
Bratislava – M. R. Štefánik Airport 
Piešťany - Piešťany Airport
Sweden
Kristianstad - Kristianstad Airport
Switzerland
Zürich – Kloten Airport
Turkey
Adana – Adana Airport
Ankara – Esenboğa Airport
Alanya – Antalya Gazipasa Airport
Antalya – Antalya Airport (hub)
Bodrum – Milas–Bodrum Airport
Dalaman – Dalaman Airport
Eskişehir - Anadolu Airport
Istanbul – Sabiha Gökçen Airport (hub)
Izmir – Adnan Menderes Airport

Fleet

The Tailwind Airlines fleet comprises the following aircraft (as of November 2017):

References

External links

2006 establishments in Turkey
Airlines of Turkey
Airlines established in 2006
Charter airlines